Pittsford Township may refer to the following places in the United States:

 Pittsford Township, Butler County, Iowa
 Pittsford Township, Michigan

See also

Pittsford (disambiguation)

	

Township name disambiguation pages